Cheer Up may refer to:

Film, theatre and television
Cheer Up, 1917 musical by John Raymond Hubbell
Cheer Up (1924 film), American silent comedy directed by Stephen Roberts (director)
Cheer Up (film), 1936 British comedy film directed by Leo Mittler
Cheer Up! (TV series), a 2015 South Korean television series
Cheer Up (South Korean TV series), a 2022 South Korean television series

Literature
Cheer Up: Love and Pompoms, 2021 graphic novel by Crystal Frasier

Music
Cheer Up (Ray Anderson, Han Bennink and Christy Doran album), 1995
Cheer Up (Plexi album) (1996)
Cheer Up! (Reel Big Fish album), album by ska punk band Reel Big Fish
"Cheer Up", a 1962 single by Kenny Roberts (musician)
"Cheer Up", a 1964 song by Paul Anka
"Cheer Up", song by Bob Marley and the Wailers from the album The Best of The Wailers
"Cheer Up", a 2015 single by Hong Jin-young from Life Note
"Cheer Up (song), a 2016 Korean-language song by South Korean girl group Twice from Page Two

Other
Cheer-Up Society, WWI servicemen's welfare organization in South Australia